Pigres of Caria the son of Seldomus, was a distinguished naval commander in the army of Xerxes I of Persia.

References
 Herodotus, vii. 98.

Carian people
Persian people of the Greco-Persian Wars
Admirals of the Achaemenid Empire
6th-century BC Iranian people